The International Teletraffic Congress (ITC) is the first international conference in networking science and practice. It was created in 1955 by Arne Jensen to initially cater to the emerging need to understand and model traffic in telephone networks using stochastic methodologies, and to bring together researchers with these considerations as a common theme. Up through World War II, teletraffic research was done mainly by engineers and
mathematicians working in telephone companies. Most of their work was published in local or company journals. In 1955, however, the field acquired a formal, international, institutional structure, with the organization of the
first International Teletraffic Congress (ITC).

Over the years, it has broaden its scope to address a wide spectrum ranging from the mathematical theory of traffic processes, stochastic system modelling and analysis, traffic and performance measurements, network management, traffic engineering to network capacity planning and cost optimization, including network economics and reliability for various types of networks. ITC served as a forum for all theoretical fundamentals and engineering practices for large-scale deployment and operation of telecommunications networks. Since its inception, ITC witnessed the evolution of communications and networking: the influence of computer science on telecommunication, the advent of the Internet and the massive deployment of mobile communications and optics, the appearance of peer-to-peer networking and social networks, the ever increasing speed and flexibility of new communication technologies, networks, user devices, and applications, and the ever changing operation challenges arising from this development. ITC documented this evolution with contemporary measurement studies, performance analyses of new technologies, recommendations for provisioning and configuration, and greatly contributed to the methodological toolbox of network scientists.

Today, with its conferences, specialist seminars, regional seminars, training courses and publications, the ITC aims at a worldwide forum for all questions related to network and service performance, management, and assessment, both present and futuristic. The notion of traffic is broadly used to encompass data traffic from the MAC layer all the way to application traffic in the application layer. The scope of ITC is thus ranging all issues embedding operations, design, planning, economics and performance analysis of current and emerging communication networks and services, to be addressed by applying a variety of tools from different fields, such as Stochastic Processes, Information theory, Control theory, Signal and Processing, Game theory and optimization techniques, Statistical methodologies and Artificial Intelligence techniques. The target audience of such issues is experts from research organizations, universities, equipment vendors and suppliers, network operators, service providers, system integrators and international technical organizations, guaranteeing a well-balanced contribution from theory, application, and practice. The general goal remains to bring researchers and practitioners together toward operational understanding of all types of current and future networks.

The ITC is ruled by the International Advisory Council (IAC) which gathers a number of technical experts, from universities and the research arms of key corporations in the industry, from countries having a strong tradition in teletraffic development. The IAC responsibilities are to disseminate information on teletraffic which is of interest for the whole community and:

to select the locations of Plenary Congresses and to ensure their high-level technical programme
to support Specialist Seminars on specific topics of current interest
to promote Regional Seminars for the dissemination of teletraffic concepts in developing countries
to facilitate the liaison activity with the ITU through participation in the standardization process and in the Development Programme

The technical program and the organization of each ITC event remains within the responsibilities of the hosting country, but with significant IAC support to guarantee that the event is consistent with the quality standards established during the previous congresses.

The ITC Plenary Congresses were scheduled tri-annually from 1955 until 1995 when the interval became bi-annual to account for the ever-accelerating development of network technologies, products and services and the associated dramatic increases in network demands. Similarly, to better cover the impact of dramatic changes undergoing in the field of computer and communication systems, networks and usage, it has been decided to hold the Plenary Congress on an annual basis from 2009.

Content 
Teletraffic science is the traditional term for all theoretical fundamentals and engineering practices to describe data flows in telecommunication networks, the performance of the usage of network resources, procedures for sizing of resources and engineering the networks for given traffic load and quality of service requirements. For more than 50 years of the 20th century, traffic or teletraffic has been identified primarily with telephone networks. With the huge development of computers, stored program control of network nodes and computer communication, the traditional teletraffic science field naturally extended to computer networks, mobile and wireless/optical networks, and for a wide spectrum of new applications. The convergence between the voice network, the Internet, the television and mobility raised new questions that request new models and tools to be developed. In addition, the development of community networks, home networking, multiple access networking technologies, and the advent of pervasive and ambient communications dictates new challenges to be addressed.
Today, ITC addresses the emerging paradigms such as an increasing diversity of distributed applications and services over various media like mobile/optical networks, enabling new markets and economy.

ITC has steered the evolutions in communications since its creation in 1955 and remains at the forefront of innovation regarding modeling and performance. The scientific roots of communications traffic are based on the theory of probability and stochastic processes, modelling and performance evaluation. Modelling is the key for the mathematical description and quantitative performance analysis. Traffic flows are described by stochastic processes with complex dependencies which have to be validated by traffic measurements. Modelling also includes operational properties of resource control reflected by service strategies such as queueing disciplines, admission control, and routing. The results of such performance analyses are used for resource dimensioning (sizing), resource management, and network optimization while providing targeted Quality of Service. Teletraffic science is closely related to methods of operation research (queueing theory, optimization, forecasting) and computational sciences (simulation technology distributed systems).

In this context, ITC represents a wide community of researchers and practitioners and is regularly organizing events like Congresses, Specialist Seminars and Workshops in order to discuss the latest changes in the modelling, design and performance of communication systems, networks and services.

The evolution of technologies of the 20th century 
ITC has been witnessing the change of communication and networking technologies which are reflected in the proceedings and programs of the congresses. The specialist seminars and the motto of the congresses thereby reflect the hot topics of that time and the evolution. Selected topics of the 70's, 80's and 90's were
 1998: Traffic Issues related to Multimedia and Nomadic Communications
 1995: Traffic Modeling and Measurement in Broadband and Mobile Communications
 1990: Broadband Technologies: Architectures, Applications, Control and Performance
 1986: ISDN Traffic Issues
 1984: Fundamentals of Teletraffic Theory
 1977: Modeling of SPC Exchanges and Data Networks

Recent topics in the 21st century 
With the rise of the Internet, new networking paradigms and technologies but also new challenges emerged:
 2020: Teletraffic in the era of beyond-5G and AI
 2019: Networked Systems and Services
 2018: Teletraffic in the Smart World
 2017: Ubiquitous, software-based, and sustainable networks and services
 2016: Digital Connected World 
 2015: Traffic, Performance and Big Data
 2014: Towards a Sustainable World 
 2013: Energy Efficient and Green Networking 
 2010: Multimedia Applications - Traffic, Performance and QoE 
 2009: Network Virtualization - Concepts and Performance 
 2008: Future Internet Design and Experimental Facilities 
 2008: Quality of Experience 
 2002: Internet Traffic Engineering and Traffic Management

Arne Jensen Lifetime Achievement Awards 
The Arne Jensen Lifetime Award has been created in memory of Arne Jensen, Founder of the International Teletraffic Congress (ITC) and Chair of the International Advisory Council (IAC) from its inception in 1955 until 1991. The Award is presented at ITCs to an individual who has provided exceptional contribution to traffic modeling, control and performance, and dedication to the teletraffic community.

 ITC 32 (Osaka, 2020): Hiroshi Saito
 ITC 31 (Budapest, 2019): Ulf Körner
 ITC 30 (Vienna, 2018): Luigi Fratta
 ITC 29 (Genoa, 2017): Hans van den Berg
 ITC 28 (Würzburg, 2016): Phuoc Tran-Gia
 ITC 27 (Ghent, 2015): Prosper Chemouil
 ITC 26 (Karlskrona, 2014): Onno J. Boxma
 ITC 25 (Shanghai, 2013): -none-
 ITC 24 (Cracow, 2012): Debasis Mitra
 ITC 23 (San Francisco, 2011): Villy-Baek Iversen
 ITC 22 (Amsterdam, 2010): James W. Roberts
 ITC 21 (Paris, 2009): Paul J. Kühn

Before ITC 21, the Award was referred to as IAC Lifetime Achievement Awards. The prize was established at the ITC 15 in Washington in 1997.
 ITC 20 (Ottawa, 2007): Jim O’Shaughnessy
 ITC 19 (Beijing, 2005): Minoru Akiyama, Clemens Pratt
 ITC 18 (Berlin, 2003): Leendert Cornelis (Leen) Kosten, Pierre Le Gall, Ryszard Syski
 ITC 15 (Washington D.C., 1997): J.W. Cohen, P.J. Burke, Alfred Descloux

ITC Conferences and Proceedings 
The proceedings of the ITC conferences are available in the ITC Digital Library: http://itc-conference.org/itc-library.html

See also
Communication
Teletraffic engineering
Global Communications Conference

References

Sources 
Official ITC website

Teletraffic